Anuprastha (sometimes transliterated Annuprastha) is a Nepali rock band. The name Anuprastha (अनुप्रस्थ) is derived from Sanskrit: Anu (अनु) means "music" and Prastha (प्रस्थ) "first". They generally focus their music on the rock genre but combine it with Nepali folk tunes.

The band was founded by Niran Shahi - Founder, Vocal & Guitar, current consists of other members Laxman Dangol - Bass; Govin Sunuwar - Guitar; Manjil Raj Shrestha - Drums; and Suresh Maharjan - Madal/Percussion.

The band successfully gained national fame and attention when they won the reality show Sprite Band Challenge 1st edition in 2008, which was aired on Nepal's national TV channel. There were three strong finalists — Anuprastha, Alt F4 and Bequeath — but Anuprastha took the winner’s trophy along with one lakh rupees and a contract to shoot a music video. They released that first music video, "Din", in July 2009. Their triumph soon had the air fragranced with their music, especially "Din".
The follow-up of the band's first music video "Din" got them the love of all the Nepali people within the country and throughout the world that still is a strong representation of never dying iconic Nepali Rock music that we crave to listen to. " Din" instantly was a hit making the entire country grove ultimately providing
"Anuprastha" the title of mainstream band. Their other hit numbers are “Sukha ra Dhukha”, “Guff”, “Kanchi” and “Nepal Sworga Bhanda Thulo Cha”.

In 2017, they launched their second album, What to Do Kathmandu. They released the single "Aduitiya" from the album. They have tour all over Nepal which includes   Narayanghat, Butwal, Bhairahawa,Birtamode, Biratnagar, Itahari, Chitwan, Kathmandu, Pokhara, Itahari, Dharan and Damak. and then Australia Dubai and Abu Dhabi with other artists.

In 2019, they released the music video of their previously Dashain Song marking the biggest festival of Nepal. They are working in their new album (third album) "Nepal Sorga vanda thulo cha".

In 2021,they released the new music video of remade Song Samjhera Malai which was included in First Album(Anuprastha).

Singles 
 Sukha ra Dukha
 Guff
 Kanchi
 Halla Gara
 Aduitiya
 Dashain 
 Nepal Sworga Bhanda Thulo Cha

Albums
 Anuprastha (2010) 
 What to Do Kathmandu? (2017)

References

External links
Anuprastha on Facebook
 Anuprastha on Youtube

Nepalese musical groups
Nepalese rock music groups
2004 establishments in Nepal